Lamis Gaber is an Egyptian politician. Gaber is a member of the Egyptian Parliament. Gaber is also a political writer and physician.

Personal life 
Gaber's husband is Yehia El-Fakharany. Gaber's children are Shady and Tarek El-Fakharany.
Gaber’s grandchildren are Yehia, Adam, Lamis and Salma.

References

21st-century Egyptian women politicians
21st-century Egyptian politicians
Living people
Year of birth missing (living people)
Members of the House of Representatives (Egypt)